Dennis Gustavo Ferrera (born December 3, 1980 in San Pedro Sula) is a retired Honduran football midfielder.

Club career
A holding midfielder, Ferrera started and played the majority of his career at hometown club Marathón in Liga Nacional de Honduras. He played 141 games for them and won two league titles.

Before the start of the 2009 Clausura, he left them for Platense but his contract was soon cancelled after revealing that he had used a banned substance. The result of the test that was carried out however turned out to be negative but his contract was not reinstated.

He joined Savio the next season.

International career
Ferrera made his debut for Honduras in a February 2005 UNCAF Nations Cup match against Nicaragua and has earned a total of 9 caps, scoring no goals. He has represented his country at the 2005 and 2007 UNCAF Nations Cups.

His final international was a February 2007 UNCAF Nations Cup match against Panama.

References

External links

1980 births
Living people
People from San Pedro Sula
Association football midfielders
Honduran footballers
Honduras international footballers
C.D. Marathón players
Platense F.C. players
Deportes Savio players
Liga Nacional de Fútbol Profesional de Honduras players
2005 UNCAF Nations Cup players
2007 UNCAF Nations Cup players